, or , is one of the six letters the Arabic alphabet added to the twenty-two inherited from the Phoenician alphabet (the others being , , ,). 
Its numerical value is 900 (see Abjad numerals).

  does not change its shape depending on its position in the word:

Pronunciation 

In Classical Arabic, it represents a velarized voiced dental fricative , and in Modern Standard Arabic, it can also be a pharyngealized voiced dental  or alveolar  fricative.

In most Arabic vernaculars  ẓādʾ and  ḍād merged quite early. The outcome depends on the dialect. Egyptian ʿaẓīm (< Classical  ʿaḏ̣īm) "great".

In the varieties (such as Bedouin and Iraqi), where the dental fricatives are preserved, both ḍād and ẓādʾ are pronounced . However, there are dialects in South Arabia and in Mauritania where both the letters are kept different but not consistently. 

A "de-emphaticized" pronunciation of both letters in the form of the plain  entered into other non-Arabic languages such as Persian, Urdu, Turkish. However, there do exist Arabic borrowings into Ibero-Romance languages as well as Hausa and Malay, where ḍād and ẓādʾ are differentiated.

Statistics 
 is the rarest phoneme of the Arabic language. Out of 2,967 triliteral roots listed by Hans Wehr in his 1952 dictionary, only 42 (1.4%) contain .

In other Semitic languages 

In relation with Hebrew 
 Examples

Character encodings

See also
Arabic phonology
Ẓ
Ḍād

References

Arabic letters